The 1800 class railmotors were a class of self-propelled diesel railmotors built by Commonwealth Engineering, Granville for the Queensland Railways.

History 

In 1949, the Queensland Railways placed an order for 12 aluminium two-carriage 1800 class railmotors with Commonwealth Engineering, Granville. Each set comprised a power car (RM – "Rail Motor") and trailer car (TP – "Trailer Passenger"). The railmotors seated 55 passengers and were delivered to Queensland Railways between 1952 and 1954.

These trains where used on most Brisbane's surburban lines as well as country lines, especially in north Queensland. When used on suburban lines they usually utilised two diesel powered railmotors at each end and one or more non powered trailer cars between the two. However, the 1800 class were not popular with passengers as they featured uncomfortable seating, poor riding qualities and inadequate ventilation for Queensland's humid subtropical climate.

Preservation 
Two trailer carriages, one of which is converted from a railmotor, remain in service on the Gulflander, operating between Normanton and Croydon, and one complete railmotor is preserved at the Rosewood Railway Museum. Three  railmotor bodies without bogies and one trailer passenger body also without bogies are privately owned.

Gallery

Summary

References 

Railcars of Queensland